Complicado is the debut studio album by Spanish singer Blas Cantó. It was released on 14 September 2018 by Warner Music Spain. The album includes the singles "In Your Bed", "Drunk and Irresponsible", "Él no soy yo" and "No volveré (A seguir tus pasos)". The album peaked at number 1 on the Spanish Albums Chart. The album was re-released on 6 September 2019 titled Complicados.

Singles
"In Your Bed" was released as the first single from the album on 3 March 2017. The song peaked at number 57 on the Spanish Singles Chart. "Drunk and Irresponsible" was released as the second single from the album on 25 August 2017. "Él no soy yo" was released as the third single from the album on 9 March 2018. The song peaked at number 35 on the Spanish Singles Chart and stayed on the list for forty weeks, achieving a platinum certification. "No volveré (A seguir tus pasos)" was released as the fourth and final single from the album on 14 September 2018. "Si te vas" was released as the lead single from the re-released album Complicados on 25 July 2019.

Track listing

Charts

Weekly charts

Year-end charts

Release history

References

2018 albums